Sindey Balderas Melgar (born 20 June 1976) is a Mexican former footballer, who last played as a defender for C.F. Ciudad Juárez in Liga MX.
His start with Tigres in 1999, put him under the direction of coach Ricardo Ferretti and he would represent the club in the Invierno 2001 final. He also played for Veracruz in 2007 and 2008.

Career
He began playing with Tigres during the Verano 1999 season under the command of Miguel Mejía Barón, replacing Fabián Peña in the 75th minute against Tecos.
Balderas scored his first league goal on 10 February 2001 in the Clásico Regiomontano (Classic Regiomontano) against Rayados after 13 minutes and had his highest-scoring season in Invierno 2001 with 4 goals, as Tigres reached the final before losing to Pachuca.
After finishing Clausura 2007 with Tigres, he moved to Veracruz, but the club was relegated to Liga de Ascenso under the command of Miguel Herrera.
He moved on loan to Indios de Ciudad Juarez for Apertura 2008 and played his last top-division match in the Bicentenario 2010 tournament.

Balderas also earned three caps for the Mexico national team, all of these during Javier Aguirre's time as the team's coach. His caps came at the 2002 CONCACAF Gold Cup, in Mexico's matches against El Salvador, Guatemala, and South Korea.

See also
List of people from Morelos, Mexico

References

External links
 

1976 births
Living people
Mexico international footballers
Tigres UANL footballers
C.D. Veracruz footballers
Indios de Ciudad Juárez footballers
Liga MX players
2002 CONCACAF Gold Cup players
Footballers from Morelos
Sportspeople from Cuernavaca
Association football defenders
Mexican footballers